Doramangalam is a census town in the Mettur taluk of Salem District, in Tamil Nadu, India.

Geography
Doramangalam is within Mettur taluk, which is in the northwestern part of Salem District. Nearby towns include Avadattur and Jalakandapuram.

Demographics
In 2011 Doramangalam had a population of 5,322 people. 2,810 (52.8%) of the inhabitants were male, while 2,512 (47.2%) were female. 497 children in the town, about 9% of the population, were at or below the age of 6. The literacy rate in the town was 58.5%. Scheduled Castes and Scheduled Tribes accounted for 8.1% and 0% of the population, respectively.

References

Cities and towns in Salem district